The 2021 NCAA Division II men's basketball tournament was an annual single-elimination tournament to determine the national champion of men's NCAA Division II college basketball in the United States. The championship games were held March 24–27, 2021 at the Ford Center in Evansville, Indiana, without fans.

Defending champions Northwest Missouri State defeated West Texas A&M in the championship game, 80–54, to claim the Bearcats' second consecutive and third overall Division II national title.

Biola, Flagler, Fresno Pacific, Lee, Malone, Northwest Nazarene, Nyack, Oklahoma Baptist, and Southern Arkansas qualified for the Division II tournament for the first time.

Qualification
A total of 48 bids were available for the tournament: 16 automatic (awarded to the champions of the sixteen Division II conferences that crowned a basketball champion after the end of the regular season) and 32 at-large. 

The field size was temporarily reduced for just the 2021 championship to account for teams and conferences that chose to not compete during the 2020–21 season due to the COVID-19 pandemic. 

Teams from four conferences (CCAA, CIAA, Northeast-10, and Sunshine State) did not participate in the regular season or the tournament. 

The remaining bids were allocated evenly among the eight NCAA-designated regions (Atlantic, Central, East, Midwest, South, South Central, Southeast, and West). Some conferences, however, were shifted from their traditional region to ensure an even distribution of teams across all eight regions. Each region consisted of two automatic qualifiers (the teams who won their respective conference tournaments) and at-large bids.

Automatic bids (16)

*Conference moved out of its usual region.

At-large bids (32)

Bracket

Atlantic Regional
 Site: West Liberty, West Virginia (West Liberty)

Central Regional
 Site: Aberdeen, South Dakota (Northern State)

East Regional
 Site: Albany, New York (Saint Rose)

Midwest Regional
 Site: Evansville, Indiana (Southern Indiana)

South Regional
 Site: Valdosta, Georgia (Valdosta State)

Southeast Regional
 Site: Harrogate, Tennessee (Lincoln Memorial)

South Central Regional
 Site: Lubbock, Texas (Lubbock Christian)

West Regional
 Site: Golden, Colorado (Colorado Mines)

Elite Eight
Site: Ford Center, Evansville, Indiana

See also 
 2021 NCAA Division II women's basketball tournament
 2021 NCAA Division I men's basketball tournament
 2021 NCAA Division III men's basketball tournament

References 

Tournament
NCAA Division II men's basketball tournament
NCAA Division II basketball tournament
NCAA Division II basketball tournament